Glaucina lowensis is a species of geometrid moth in the family Geometridae. It is found in North America.

The MONA or Hodges number for Glaucina lowensis is 6509.

References

Further reading

 
 

Boarmiini